SS Alexander Macomb was a Liberty ship built in the United States during World War II. She was named after Alexander Macomb, the Commanding General of the United States Army from May 29, 1828, until his death on June 25, 1841. Macomb was the field commander at the Battle of Plattsburgh, during the War of 1812, and after the stunning victory, was lauded with praise and styled "The Hero of Plattsburgh" by some of the American press. He was promoted to Major General for his conduct, receiving both the Thanks of Congress and a Congressional Gold Medal.

Construction
Alexander Macomb was laid down on 18 February 1942, under a Maritime Commission (MARCOM) contract, MCE hull 36, by the Bethlehem-Fairfield Shipyard, Baltimore, Maryland; and was launched on 6 May 1942.

History
She was allocated to A. H. Bull Steamship Company, on 2 June 1942.

Sinking
The convoy was set to departed from the northern end of the Cape Cod Canal on 2 July 1942, but with the grounding of the cargo ship  on 28 June 1942, it was forced to sail around Cape Cod.

On the evening of 3 July 1942, sailing in heavy fog and with the fear of colliding with other ships in the convoy, Alexander Macomb fell behind. With hope of catching up with the convoy in daylight, the captain of Alexander Macomb only maintained an intermittent zigzag course. The torpedo caused her cargo of explosives to ignite and burst into flames. The crew of eight officers, 33 crewmen, and 25 Armed guard were able to abandon the ship in three lifeboats and a raft. Because the ship had not been secured and still had forward movement one of the lifeboats capsized. The British trawler  picked up 23 crewmen and 8 Armed guards, while the Canadian corvette  picked up another 14 crewmen and 11 Armed guards. Six Armed guards and four crewmen died in the attack.

Le Tiger and  pursued U-215 and succeeded in sinking her with depth charges, with a loss of all hands.

Wreck discovery
The wreck of Alexander Macomb was discovered in October 1964, by the Risdon Beazley company salvage ship Droxford at position . The bulk of the metal cargo was removed in 1965, by Droxford. She is considered to be "dangerous to dive".

The wreck of U-215 was discovered by Canadian divers and marine archaeologists in July 2004.

References

Bibliography

 
 
 
 
 
 
 

 

World War II shipwrecks in the Atlantic Ocean
Shipwrecks of the Massachusetts coast
Liberty ships
Ships built in Baltimore
1942 ships
Maritime incidents in July 1942
Ships sunk by German submarines in World War II